Camp Muir, named for the naturalist John Muir, is a high-altitude refuge for climbers in Mount Rainier National Park in Washington, accessed through the Paradise Entrance. The shelters comprising the camp are situated at a   elevation between the Muir Snowfield and the Cowlitz Glacier on Mount Rainier. Camp Muir is the most-used high camp for those attempting to climb to the mountain's summit.  Camp Muir is between the Nisqually and Paradise Glaciers.

The larger "public" shelter hut was built in 1921 to plans supervised by Daniel Ray Hull of the National Park Service. The  by  single-story one-room shelter was initially constructed of dry-laid stone. It replaced a smaller shelter which was used as a shelter for climbing guides. A dedication plaque at the entrance to the large shelter plaque reads "Erected in memory of John Muir, 1921." The guide shelter was built in 1916 by a climbing organization, the Mountaineers. It was designed by Seattle architect Carl F. Gould, a member of the Mountaineers and was approved by Park Service director Stephen T. Mather. Two stone pit toilets were built at Camp Muir in 1936 by the Civilian Conservation Corps, one of which survives and is used for storage.

There are 12 approaches to the summit from Paradise.  Camp Muir provides 7 of those.  Of the 7, 4 are grade II, 2 are grade III, and 1 is grade II-III.

Camp Muir was placed on the National Register of Historic Places on March 13, 1991. It is part of the Mount Rainier National Historic Landmark District, which encompasses the entire park and which recognizes the park's inventory of Park Service-designed rustic architecture.

References

Buildings and structures in Pierce County, Washington
Rustic architecture in Washington (state)
Buildings and structures in Mount Rainier National Park
Park buildings and structures on the National Register of Historic Places in Washington (state)
National Register of Historic Places in Mount Rainier National Park
John Muir